Thomas Neill, Neel, or Neal(e) may refer to:

Thomas Neel (died 1410), English politician
Thomas Neale (1641–1699), British politician
Thomas H. Neill (1826–1885), American soldier
Sir Thomas Neill (insurance executive) (1856–1937), British insurance executive
Thomas Neill (cricketer) (1867–1949), New Zealand cricketer
Tom Neale (1902–1977), New Zealand bushcraft and survival enthusiast
Tom Neal (1914–1972), American actor
Tommy Neill (1919–1980), American baseball player
Tommy Neill (footballer) (1930–1996), Scottish footballer
Thomas Neill (swimmer), Australian swimmer

See also
Thomas O'Neill (disambiguation)